Lawrence County is a county located in the U.S. state of Arkansas. As of the 2020 census, the population was 16,216. The county seat is Walnut Ridge.  Lawrence County is Arkansas's second county, formed on January 15, 1815, and named for Captain James Lawrence who fought in the War of 1812. It is an alcohol prohibition or dry county.

History
Following the Louisiana Purchase, the area currently encompassing Lawrence County was contained within the Louisiana Territory from 1805 to 1812, and the Missouri Territory from 1812 until the creation of Arkansas Territory in 1819. While the southern portion of Missouri Territory began to be settled, Lawrence County was created on January 15, 1815 from New Madrid County and Arkansas County. The large area spanned from Cape Girardeau County to the Arkansas River.

Geography

Adjacent counties
Randolph County (north)
Greene County (east)
Craighead County (southeast)
Jackson County (south)
Independence County (southwest)
Sharp County (west)

Demographics

2020 census

As of the 2020 United States census, there were 16,216 people, 6,463 households, and 4,466 families residing in the county.

2000 census
As of the 2000 census, there were 17,774 people, 7,108 households, and 5,011 families residing in the county.  The population density was 30 people per square mile (12/km2).  There were 8,085 housing units at an average density of 14 per square mile (5/km2).  The racial makeup of the county was 97.78% White, 0.44% Black or African American, 0.57% Native American, 0.05% Asian, 0.01% Pacific Islander, 0.12% from other races, and 1.02% from two or more races.  0.68% of the population were Hispanic or Latino of any race.

There were 7,108 households, out of which 30.80% had children under the age of 18 living with them, 57.70% were married couples living together, 9.60% had a female householder with no husband present, and 29.50% were non-families. 26.70% of all households were made up of individuals, and 14.20% had someone living alone who was 65 years of age or older.  The average household size was 2.42 and the average family size was 2.92.

In the county, the population was spread out, with 24.00% under the age of 18, 9.60% from 18 to 24, 25.90% from 25 to 44, 23.20% from 45 to 64, and 17.40% who were 65 years of age or older.  The median age was 38 years. For every 100 females there were 93.60 males.  For every 100 females age 18 and over, there were 89.40 males.

The median income for a household in the county was $27,139, and the median income for a family was $32,163. Males had a median income of $26,288 versus $18,518 for females. The per capita income for the county was $13,785.  About 13.90% of families and 18.40% of the population were below the poverty line, including 25.50% of those under age 18 and 20.10% of those age 65 or over.

Government

Education
Public education is available from four school districts:
 Hillcrest School District
 Hoxie School District
 Lawrence County School District
 Sloan–Hendrix School District

Communities

Cities
Black Rock
Hoxie
Walnut Ridge (county seat)

Towns

Alicia
College City (former)
Imboden
Lynn
Minturn
Portia
Powhatan
Ravenden
Sedgwick
Smithville
Strawberry

Townships

 Annieville
 Ashland (Minturn)
 Black River (Powhatan)
 Black Rock (most of Black Rock)
 Boas (Hoxie, part of Walnut Ridge)
 Cache
 Campbell (College City, most of Walnut Ridge)
 Dent (Imboden)
 Duty (Portia, small part of Black Rock)
 Eaton
 Flat Creek
 Jesup
 Lawrence
 Marion (Alicia)
 Morgan (Lynn)
 Promised Land (Sedgwick)
 Reeds Creek (Strawberry)
 Richwoods (small part of Walnut Ridge)
 Spring River (small part of Ravenden)
 Strawberry (Smithville)
 Thacker (most of Ravenden)

Infrastructure

Major highways

 

 U.S. Route 63B
 U.S. Route 67B
 
 U.S. Route 412
 Highway 25
 Highway 34
 Highway 90
 Highway 91
 Highway 115
 Highway 117
 Highway 117 Spur
 Highway 228
 Highway 230
 Highway 361

See also
 List of lakes in Lawrence County, Arkansas
 National Register of Historic Places listings in Lawrence County, Arkansas

References

Further reading 

 

 
1815 establishments in Missouri Territory
Populated places established in 1815